Beijing Information Science & Technology University (BISTU) is a school of higher education and a merger in founding process of Beijing Institute of Machinery and Beijing Information Technology Institute. The university takes engineering as its main faculty combined with management, liberal and science programs. It is a member of the Plan 111.

Schools and departments
School of Information and Communication Engineering
School of Computer Science and Technology
School of Mechanical and  Electronic Engineering
School of Instrument Science and Optic Engineering
School of Automation Engineering
School of Human and Social Science
School of Politic Philosophy and Education
School of Economics Management
School of Information Administration
School of Foreign Languages
School of Sciences
Graduate School

References

External links
 English Homepage
 Chinese Homepage

Universities and colleges in Beijing
Educational institutions established in 1937
Plan 111
1937 establishments in China